Cyphodynerus is an Afrotropical and Palearctic genus of potter wasps. It contains the following species:

 Cyphodynerus bisellatus (Schulthess, 1914)
 Cyphodynerus canaliculatus (Saussure, 1856) 
 Cyphodynerus guillarmodi Giordani Soika, 1985
 Cyphodynerus kimberleyensis Giordani Soika, 1985
 Cyphodynerus rubroniger (Bingham, 1902)
 Cyphodynerus salekanus (Strand, 1922) 
 Cyphodynerus sculpturatus (Dover, 1925)

References

Hymenoptera genera
Potter wasps